Coronations in Russia involved a highly developed religious ceremony in which the Emperor of Russia (generally referred to as the Tsar) was crowned and invested with regalia, then anointed with chrism and formally blessed by the church to commence his reign.  Although rulers of Muscovy had been crowned prior to the reign of Ivan III, their coronation rituals assumed overt Byzantine overtones as the result of the influence of Ivan's wife Sophia Paleologue, and the imperial ambitions of his grandson, Ivan IV.  The modern coronation, introducing "Western European-style" elements, replaced the previous "crowning" ceremony and was first used for Catherine I in 1724. Since tsarist Russia claimed to be the "Third Rome" and the replacement of Byzantium as the true Christian state, the Russian rite was designed to link its rulers and prerogatives to those of the so-called "Second Rome" (Constantinople).

While months or even years could pass between the initial accession of the sovereign and the performance of this ritual, church policy held that the monarch must be anointed and crowned according to the Orthodox rite to have a successful tenure.  As the church and state were essentially one in Imperial Russia, this service invested the Tsars with political legitimacy; however, this was not its only intent.  It was equally perceived as conferring a genuine spiritual benefit that mystically wedded sovereign to subjects, bestowing divine authority upon the new ruler.  As such, it was similar in purpose to other European coronation ceremonies from the medieval era.

Even when the imperial capital was located at St. Petersburg (1713–1728, 1732–1917), Russian coronations were always held in Moscow at the Cathedral of the Dormition in the Kremlin.  The last coronation service in Russia was held on 26 May 1896 for Nicholas II and his wife Alexandra Feodorovna, who would be the final Tsar and Tsaritsa of Russia.  The Russian Imperial regalia survived the subsequent Russian Revolution and the Communist period, and are currently on exhibit in a museum at the Kremlin Armoury.

Starting with the reign of Ivan IV, the ruler of Russia was known as "Tsar" rather than "Grand Prince"; "Tsar" being a Slavonic equivalent to the Latin term "Caesar".  This continued until 1721, during the reign of Peter I, when the title was formally changed to Imperator (Emperor).  Peter's decision reflected the difficulties other European monarchs had in deciding whether to recognize the Russian ruler as an emperor or a mere king, and reflected his insistence on being seen as the former.  However, the term "Tsar" remained the popular title for the Russian ruler despite the formal change of style, thus this article utilizes that term, rather than "Emperor".

Symbolism
In medieval Europe, the anointed Christian ruler was viewed as a mixta persona, part priest and part layman, but never wholly either. The Russian Orthodox Church considered the Tsar to be "wedded" to his subjects in the Orthodox coronation service.

The Orthodox concept on this subject was explained by Russian bishop Nektarios (Kontzevich), a prelate of the Russian Orthodox Church Abroad:

Since no Orthodox layperson, regardless of societal or political rank, was ever permitted to pass through the Royal Doors or partake of communion in both kinds separately, the permission given to the Tsar to do both during his coronation ritual was intended to demonstrate both the solemn nature of the ritual, and the spiritual duties and authority devolving upon the new monarch.  Sacred and secular, church and state, God and government were all welded together by the coronation service in the person of the anointed Tsar—or so many Russians believed.

Since the newly ascended sovereign was permitted all the privileges of rule immediately upon his accession, coronations were not necessarily held right away.  Instead, one or more years might be permitted to elapse between the initial accession of a Tsar and the ceremony itself.  This allowed the court to finish its mourning for the new sovereign's predecessor, and permitted completion of the immense arrangements involved in staging the ritual.

Imperial regalia

As in most European monarchies, the Tsars of Russia retained a sizable collection of Imperial regalia, some of which was used in their coronation ceremonies.  The most important items included:

The sovereign's crown

Russian rulers from Dmitri Donskoi to Peter the Great utilized the Cap of Monomakh, a fourteenth-century gold filigree cap with sable trimming, adorned with pearls and other precious stones.  Although Russian legend held that it had been given to Vladimir Monomakh by the Byzantine emperor Constantine IX, more modern scholarship assigns an Asian origin to this diadem.

With the accession of Peter the Great as Emperor of Russia in 1721, he undertook a programme of "westernizing" various aspects of Russian society. In line with this, the regalia also became influenced by Western-style. He replaced Monomakh's diadem with one modelled on the private crowns of the Holy Roman emperors, of which the Imperial Crown of Austria is one example.  Peter's wife, who succeeded him as Catherine I, was the first to wear this type of diadem.  For the coronation of Catherine the Great (Catherine II) in 1762, court jewelers Ekhart and Jérémie Pauzié decided to create a new crown, known as the Great Imperial Crown, which used the style of a mitre divided into two half-spheres with a central arch between them topped by diamonds and a 398.72-carat red spinel from China.  The crown was produced in a record two months and weighted only 2.3 kg.
This crown was used in all coronations from Paul I to Nicholas II—although the latter tried (but failed) to replace it with Monomakh's Crown for his ceremony.  It survived the subsequent revolution, and is considered to be one of the main treasures of the Romanov dynasty, now on display in the  Kremlin Armoury Museum in Moscow.

The consort's crown 
A smaller crown, virtually identical in appearance and workmanship to the Great Imperial Crown, was manufactured for the crowning of the Tsar's consort.  It was encrusted with diamonds, and first used for Tsaritsa Maria Feodorovna, wife of Paul I, being last used at the coronation of Nicholas II by Dowager Empress Maria Feodorovna. An identical new consort crown was made for Alexandra Feodorovna. The reason for this was that an already-crowned dowager empress outranked a new empress consort at the Russian court. The consort crown was often referred to as the "Smaller Imperial Crown", to differentiate it from the Tsar's Great Imperial Crown.

Sceptre and orb
The Imperial sceptre was manufactured during the reign of Catherine the Great, and comprised "a burnished shaft of three sections containing eight rings of brilliant-cut diamonds", topped by the Orlov Diamond which was itself surmounted by a double-headed eagle with the coat of arms of Russia at its center.

The orb was manufactured in 1762 for Catherine II's coronation, and consisted of a polished hollow ball made from red gold encircled by two rows of diamonds and surmounted by a large sapphire topped by a cross.

The banner of state
Each Tsar had a Banner of State manufactured for his coronation and reign.  This banner was blessed on the eve of the coronation, in the Kremlin Armoury, and was present at his crowning the next day, as well as at significant events during his reign thereafter.

The coronation

Entry into Moscow

Russian coronations took place in Moscow, the country's ancient capital. The new ruler made a great processional entrance on horseback into the city, accompanied by multiple cavalry squadrons, his consort (in an accompanying carriage) and the pealing of literally thousands of church bells. The new Tsar stopped at the Chapel of Our Lady of Iveron, home of the Icon of the Blessed Virgin of Iveron, one of the most revered icons in Moscow. It was a tradition with Russian Tsars that every entry to the Kremlin be marked by the veneration of this image.

Following his entry into the city the new Tsar and his entourage took time to rest and prepare for the following day's ceremony, while heralds in medieval clothing read out special proclamations to "the good people of Our first capital".  Receptions were held for foreign diplomats, the Banner of State was consecrated, and the imperial regalia were brought from the Kremlin Armoury to the throne hall for the procession to the cathedral.  In conjunction with the Tsar's entry into Moscow, fines were remitted, prisoners pardoned, and a three-day holiday was proclaimed.

Coronation procession

The Tsar was met on the morning of his coronation at the Kremlin Palace's Red Porch, where he took his place beneath a large canopy held by thirty-two Russian generals, with other officers providing additional support.  Accompanied by his wife (under a separate canopy) and the regalia, he proceeded slowly toward the Cathedral of the Dormition, where his anointing and crowning would take place.  Among the items of regalia in the parade were the Chain of the Order of St. Andrew the First-Called for the Tsaritsa, the Sword of State, the Banner of State, the State Seal, the Purple Robe for the Tsar, the Orb, the Sceptre, the Small Imperial Crown and the Great Imperial Crown, all arranged in a strict order.  Aides-de-camp to the Tsar, generals of the Suite and the Horse Guards troop lined up along the route, from the Red Porch to the cathedral. The Hof-Marshal, the Hof-Marshal in Chief and the Supreme Marshal, each with a mace in his hand, silently joined the procession, which also boasted the Ministers of the War Office and Imperial Court, the Commander of the Imperial Residence, the Adjutant General of the Day, the orderly Major General of the Suite and the Commander of the Horse Guards regiment, among others.

The Tsar and his wife were met at the cathedral door by the Orthodox prelates, chief among them either the Patriarch of Russia or (during times when there was no Patriarch) the Metropolitan Bishop of Moscow.  The presiding bishop offered the Cross to the monarchs for kissing, while another hierarch sprinkled them with holy water.  Once they had entered the cathedral, they venerated the icons there three times, then took their places on the cathedral dais, where two large thrones had been set up.  One of these was the throne of Tsar Michael I, first Tsar of the Romanov dynasty, who ascended the throne in 1613; the other was that of Ivan III, who created the title of "Tsar of all the Russias" in the fifteenth century. Protocol prohibited any crowned sovereign from witnessing the coronation. However, in 1896, exceptions were made for Tsar Nicholas II's mother, Maria Feodorovna, and Nicholas' aunt-by-marriage, Queen Olga of Greece, a Romanov grand duchess by birth and consort of Nicholas' maternal uncle, King George I.

The ceremony begins

The ceremony itself commenced with the singing of Psalm 101, as the Tsar was invited to recite the Niceno-Constantinopolitan Creed according to the Eastern Orthodox usage, without the Filioque clause. Then the Tsar was given a book containing a prayer for him to read, following which the prelate pronounced a blessing upon him.

The Tsar now removed the chain of the Order of St. Andrew, and was robed in Purple by the Metropolitans of St. Petersburg and Kiev.  Bowing his head, he now had hands laid upon him by the chief celebrant, who read two prayers over him.  These two prayers originated in, and were identical with, those found in the Byzantine coronation ritual.  In the first of these prayers the presiding Metropolitan prayed:

After the greeting of "Peace be with you" by the Metropolitan came the deacon's command: "Bow your heads unto the Lord".  The Metropolitan now read the second prayer, as all inclined their heads:

Crowning of the Tsar

Following this the new ruler directed the Metropolitan to hand him the Imperial Crown. The Tsar took the crown from the Metropolitan's hands and placed it upon his own head, as the prelate invoked the name of the Holy Trinity.  This was in keeping with the custom inherited from the Byzantine Emperors, and was intended to indicate that the imperial power, which the Tsars viewed as the direct continuation of the Christian Roman Empire (Byzantium), came directly from God. The prayer of the Metropolitan or Patriarch, similar to that of the Patriarch of Constantinople for the Byzantine Emperor, confirmed the imperial supremacy:

Next the Tsar received his sceptre and orb, given to him by the Metropolitan, who again invoked the Christian Trinity and then recited these words:

Crowning of the Tsaritsa-consort

Once the Tsar had received the crown, sceptre and orb, he seated himself upon his throne holding the orb in his left hand, and the sceptre in his right. Summoning an aide, he divested himself of the sceptre and orb as his wife knelt upon a crimson cushion before him. Taking off his crown, the Tsar placed it briefly upon her head before returning it to his own. The Tsar next placed the Tsaritsa's crown upon his consort's head and the chain of the Order of St. Andrew around her neck, accompanied by a purple mantle, signifying her sharing in his dignity and responsibility for the nation's welfare.

According to Baroness Sophie Buxhoeveden, lady-in-waiting and friend of the last Tsaritsa, Alexandra Feodorovna, the Tsaritsa saw her role in her husband's coronation as "a kind of mystic marriage to Russia. She became one with Russia, sealed forever a Russian in heart and soul, and so she remained from that day and all her life.  The long Divine Liturgy, the robing of the Emperor, his investiture with the Imperial insignia, she saw as in a dream."  According to Buxhoeveden, Alexandra never tired at all throughout the five-hour ritual, insisting that everything was "beautiful".

Prior to Maria Fedorovna's crowning in 1797, only two other Russian consorts had ever been crowned: Marina Mniszech, wife of Tsar Dmitri I the False, who was crowned in 1606; and Catherine, wife of Peter I, who reigned over Russia in her own right following Peter's death.  The Russian Orthodox Church had generally opposed the crowning of women prior to Peter's reign, and his decision to introduce this innovation reflected his desire to break with previous tradition and bring Russia more into line with other Western monarchies. The church incorporated these developments into its coronation ritual, retaining them through the final ceremony in 1896. At the coronation of Alexander II, Empress Marie Alexandrovna's crown slipped from her head, which was taken as a bad-omen.

The "many years" and the anointing

After the crowning of his consort, the newly crowned Tsar retrieved his orb and sceptre, while the cathedral choir intoned the Orthodox prayer for "many years" of health and a long, prosperous reign for both Tsar and Tsaritsa.  This was accompanied by the ringing of bells and a 101-gun salute outside the cathedral.  Kneeling, the Tsar again handed his orb and sceptre to his attendant, then recited a prayer.  Following this, he rose to his feet, while the presiding bishop and all others present knelt to pray for him on behalf of all the Russian people while the choir sang: "We praise Thee, O God".

The text of the Tsar's prayer read as follows:

The Emperor now set aside his crown and the Orthodox Divine Liturgy immediately followed.  The anointing portion of the ceremony took place during the liturgy, immediately prior to Communion.  After the singing of the Communion hymn, the Tsar gave his sword to an attendant and he and the Tsaritsa ascended the Ambo in front of the Royal Doors of the iconostasis, which were thrown open at that moment. There each was anointed with holy chrism by the Patriarch or Metropolitan.  The Tsar was anointed on his forehead, eyes, nostrils, mouth, ears, breast and both sides of each hand, then he stepped aside to his right and stood in front of the icon of Christ.  His consort then stepped forward and was anointed on her forehead only, then she stepped to her left and stood before the icon of the Theotokos. Each anointing was accompanied by the words, "the seal of the gift of the Holy Spirit."  Bells and a second 101-gun salvo ensued.

After his anointing, but prior to the partaking of Holy Communion, the Tsar recited a coronation oath, in which he swore to preserve the autocracy intact and to rule his realm with justice and fairness.  Russia's last Tsar, Nicholas II, would refer to his coronation oath as one reason he could not give in to demands for a liberal constitution and parliamentary government. The Metropolitan next escorted the Tsar through the Royal Doors (normally permitted only to deacons, priests or bishops) into the altar, where the Tsar partook of the bread and wine separately, in clerical fashion.  This was the only time the Tsar—or any Orthodox layperson—was ever permitted to receive communion in this manner.  Unlike the Tsar, the Tsaritsa remained outside the Royal Doors and communicated in standard Orthodox lay fashion, receiving both the bread and the wine together on a spoon.

The service concludes
After receiving Holy Communion, the Tsar and Tsaritsa returned to their thrones, where the "Prayers After Receipt of Holy Communion" were read over them by their Father Confessor.  Following this, the Tsar received homage from his wife, mother (if living) and other family members, nobles, and notable subjects present at his coronation.  The dismissal was read, as the Archdeacon intoned a special blessing for the Tsar and Imperial Family, with the choir singing "many years" three times.  This concluded the portion of the coronation conducted inside the cathedral, but other separate ceremonies and celebrations still remained.

After the service

Return to the palace

At the conclusion of the Liturgy, the Tsar and his entourage proceeded to the nearby Archangel and Annunciation cathedrals within the Kremlin, where further rites were conducted.  After this, the newly crowned monarchs proceeded under canopies back to the Red Porch of the Kremlin, where they rested and prepared for a great ceremonial meal at the Kremlin's Hall of Facets.  During their procession back to their Kremlin palace, later rulers (starting with Nicholas I) stopped on the Red Staircase and bowed three times to the assembled people in the courtyard, symbolizing what one historian has called "an unspoken bond of devotion" between ruler and subjects.

Inside the palace, the Tsar and Tsaritsa greeted representatives of their many Muslim subjects and other non-Christian guests; protocol prohibited non-Christians from witnessing inside the cathedral. At the coronation of Nicholas II and Alexandra, the Chinese statesman Li Hongzhang was one of the guests, representing his emperor. In another room of the palace stood a group of people in normal clothes; these were descendants of people who had saved the lives of Russian rulers at one time or another.  After greeting all of these people, the sovereigns rested for a short while and prepared for the evening's banquet.

The coronation banquet
The Tsar's coronation banquet was held on the evening of his coronation, in the Granovitaya Palata, council chamber of Muscovite rulers.  The walls were adorned with frescoes, and a special table was set for the Tsar and his consort, who dined alone while being served by high-ranking members of the court.  Foreign ambassadors were admitted one at a time, and the new sovereign drank a toast with each in turn.
Foreign princes (no foreign rulers were ever invited to a Russian coronation, but foreign princes attended as representatives of their own monarchs) were seated in an upper gallery or Tainik, as only Russians could take part in the banquet itself.

According to biographer Robert K. Massie, the following items were served at Nicholas II's coronation dinner in 1896:

Borsch and pepper-pot soup,
Turnovers filled with meat,
Steamed fish,
Whole spring lamb,
Pheasants in cream sauce,
Asparagus and Salad,
Sweet fruits in wine,
Ice cream.

Other celebrations
Following the banquet, the newly crowned monarchs attended other ceremonies, often including a grand illumination of the Kremlin, fireworks, operas, and various balls.  A special celebration was often organized for the common people of Moscow, usually a day or so after the ceremony at a nearby location where the Tsar and Tsaritsa would attend a feast held for their subjects and inexpensive souvenirs were given away.  The celebration at Nicholas II's coronation in 1896 was marred by the Khodynka Tragedy, when 1,389 persons were trampled to death during a stampede prompted by rumors that there were not enough mementos to go around.

With the abolition of the monarchy after the Russian Revolution of 1917, coronation ceremonies no longer play any role in Russian political or religious life.

List of Russian coronations
While earlier rulers of Muscovy had been crowned prior to Prince Ivan III, the coronation ceremony in its "Byzantine" form was first brought to Russia by Ivan's wife, Sophia Paleologue, niece to the last Emperor of Byzantium, Constantine XI.  Sophia is credited with introducing this and other Byzantine ceremonies and customs, which were adopted by her husband Ivan III and continued under his Muscovite and Russian successors. The modern coronation, introducing "European-style" elements, was first used for Catherine I in 1724.

While several Russian rulers had more than one consort during their reigns, this table will list only that consort (if any) who was crowned with him or her at the time of their coronation.  There are two exceptions to this rule:

Marina Mniszech, who married Dmitriy I the False after he had already been crowned as Tsar, and was afforded her own coronation after their wedding.
Yekaterina Alexeyevna, second wife of Peter I, who was crowned as co-ruler of Russia in 1724 and subsequently ascended the throne as Catherine I after Peter's death.

Other Russian sovereigns either did not have consorts at the time of their coronations, did not ever crown their consorts, or (beginning with Paul I and continuing until Nicholas II) had them crowned with them at their own coronations.

Rurik dynasty
Grand Prince Ivan III of Moscow was the first Russian ruler to break free of the Tatar Yoke; he claimed the title "Grand Prince of All Russia" and used the title "Tsar" in diplomatic correspondence.  His grandson, Ivan IV, was the first to be formally crowned as "Tsar of All Russia", as opposed to his predecessors' formal title.

Time of Troubles
Following the death of Tsar Feodor I, Russia descended into a fifteen-year period of political unrest, famine, upheaval and foreign invasion known as the Time of Troubles.  Some of the rulers during this period did not reign long enough or enjoy the political stability necessary to hold a coronation, while one was a foreigner, Wladyslaw IV Vasa of the Polish–Lithuanian Commonwealth.  From July 1610 to July 1613, two rival councils of nobles claimed power; Russia had no Tsar at all from December 4, 1612 to July 26, 1613, when Michael Romanov was elected to the throne by the Zemsky Sobor, establishing the Romanov Dynasty.

At the time of Tsar Dmitriy I the False's coronation in 1605, he was unmarried; however, after his marriage to Marina Mniszech of Poland in 1606, his consort was granted her own crowning ceremony upon her arrival in Moscow.

Romanov dynasty
The Romanov dynasty came to power in July 1613, and ruled Russia until the Russian Revolution of 1917, when the monarchy was abolished.  Tsars Ivan VI and Peter III were never crowned, as neither reigned long enough to have a coronation ceremony.  Peter the Great adopted the formal title of "Emperor" during his reign and his successors used it until the Revolution, but common usage still assigned the title of "Tsar" to the Russian monarch.

Notes

References
 Buxhoeveden, Baroness Sophie, The Life and Tragedy of Empress Alexandra Fedorovna.  Longmans, Green and Co., 1928.  ASIN: B00085D73E
 Gilbert's Royal Books, Last Coronation of a Russian Tsar.
 R. Monk Zachariah (Liebmann), "Martyrology of the Communist Yoke: The Life of Tsar-Martyr Nicholas II", The Orthodox Word, 153 (1990).
 Massie, Robert K., Nicholas and Alexandra.  Athenium Books, 1967.
 Sokholov, D., Archpriest, A Manual of the Orthodox Church's Divine Services, Holy Trinity Monastery, Jordanville, NY, date unknown.
 Wooley, Maxwell, B.D., Coronation Rites.  Cambridge University Press, 1915.
 Wortman, Richard S., Scenarios of Power: Myth and Ceremony in Russian Monarchy from Peter the Great to the Abdication of Nicholas II. Princeton University Press, 2006.
 Слюнькова И. Н., Проекты оформления коронационных торжеств в России XIX века. — М., Буксмарт, 2013 438 с.

External links
Although no photography was permitted inside the Cathedral of the Dormition during the crowning of Nicholas II or any Russian Tsar, several artistic representations of the ceremony have been made (some of which have been reproduced in this article), and numerous photos and even one motion picture exist of the Tsar's procession, coronation celebrations and other events taking place outside of the church and in surrounding areas of Moscow.  Some of these include:

Video
Coronation of Nicholas II. Rare outdoor motion picture footage from Nicholas II's crowning ceremony, on YouTube.

Photos
 Royal Russia Coronation of Tsar Nicholas II and Alexandra. Article in two parts with two videos and over 60 vintage photographs of the coronation.
 1896 Coronation of Nicholas II and Alexandra. Contains hundreds of photos from Nicholas II's coronation.
 Coronation of Nicholas II. Contains drawings from a commemorative album of Nicholas II's coronation.  Includes portraits of the heralds, entry procession, and of Nicholas receiving Holy Communion at the cathedral altar.
 The Russian Crown Jewels. Contains photos of the Imperial crown, sceptre and orb, with details about each.
 In Memory of the Coronation of their Imperial Majesties. Contains scenes from another commemorative album of Nicholas II's coronation.

Russia
Russian monarchy
Russian Orthodox Church in Russia
Ceremonies in Russia
History of the Russian Orthodox Church